Inge Koch was a German figure skater who competed in pair skating.

With partner Günther Noack, she won bronze medals at two World Figure Skating Championships (in 1938 and 1939) and two European Figure Skating Championships (also in 1938 and 1939).

Competitive highlights 
With Günther Noack

References 

German female pair skaters
Year of birth missing
Year of death missing